Mezoneuron kavaiense is a rare shrub or small tree in the genus Mezoneuron (pea family, Fabaceae), that is endemic to Hawaii. Common names include Uhiuhi (the Big Island and Kauai), Kāwau (Maui), and Kea (Maui). It is threatened by invasive species, particularly feral ungulates.

Description

The bark is dark grey and made up of rectangular or oblong platelets. The bisexual flowers have pink to rose sepals and red anthers. They form on pink to red terminal racemes  in length. Blooming takes place from December to March.

Habitat
Associated plants include lama (Diospyros sandwicensis), aalii (Dodonaea viscosa), and alahee (Psydrax odorata). Populations formerly existed on Kauai (Waimea Canyon), West Maui, Lānai, the Big Island (North Kona District), and Oahu (Waianae Range), but are only found in the latter two today.

Uses
The wood of M. kavaiense is very dense and hard, nearly black, and close-grained. Native Hawaiians used it to make ōō (digging sticks), ihe (spears), laau melomelo (fishing lures), pou (house posts), runners for papa hōlua (sleds), pāhoa (daggers), laau palau (clubs), and laau kahi wauke (Broussonetia papyrifera scraping boards).  The rose-colored flowers are collected to make lei.  A blood purifier was made from the young leaves, leaf buds, and bark of uhiuhi mashed together with the inner bark of hāpuu (Cibotium spp.), okolehao, ulu (Artocarpus altilis) bark, uhaloa (Waltheria indica) taproots, and ko kea (Saccharum officinarum).

Conservation
The plant is very rare today, with fewer than 100 individuals remaining in the wild, with some estimates at fewer than 50 plants. It does not reproduce very successfully, having a low level of recruitment. The plant's habitat has been degraded or destroyed by development, agriculture, and fire, and invaded by exotic species of plants and animals. The invasive fountaingrass (Pennisetum setaceum) is particularly harmful to the habitat, covering whole fields and increasing the danger of fire. The seeds are eaten by rats, and cattle and goats graze in the area. An insect, the black coffee twig borer (Xylosandrus compactus), damages the seedlings and saplings. Since the wood is so highly sought after, the trees are still in danger of being harvested. The population on the Big Island grows on the side of Hualālai, a dormant volcano, and so is technically in danger of being extirpated in the event of an eruption.

The plant was federally listed as an endangered species of the United States in 1986.

References

Caesalpinieae
Endemic flora of Hawaii
Biota of Hawaii (island)
Biota of Oahu
Trees of Hawaii
Plants described in 1867
Taxonomy articles created by Polbot